Driopea cyrtomera is a species of beetle in the family Cerambycidae. It was described by Per Olof Christopher Aurivillius in 1922. While larvae, these beetles usually drill into wood and can cause damage to trees or logged timber.

References

Driopea
Beetles described in 1922